Andrew Robert Knizner (born February 3, 1995) is an American professional baseball catcher for the St. Louis Cardinals of Major League Baseball (MLB).

Amateur career
Knizner attended Hanover High School in Mechanicsville, Virginia. During his senior year, he was captain of the school's baseball team while batting .453 with five home runs, leading Hanover to a Virginia Class AAA state championship. After graduating, he attended North Carolina State University where he played college baseball for the NC State Wolfpack. Prior to his sophomore season, he switched from third base to catcher. In 2014 and 2015, he played collegiate summer baseball in the Cape Cod Baseball League for the Wareham Gatemen. As a junior, he batted .292 with six home runs and 30 RBIs, along with compiling a .991 fielding percentage and throwing out 16 of 37 base runners attempting to steal. After his junior year, Knizner was drafted by the St. Louis Cardinals in the seventh round of the 2016 Major League Baseball draft.

Professional career
Knizner signed with St. Louis and made his professional debut with the Johnson City Cardinals and posted a .319 batting average with six home runs and 42 runs batted in (RBI) in 53 games. He was named to the Appalachian League postseason All-Star team. He started 2017 with the Peoria Chiefs and was the starting catcher in the Midwest League All-Star Game. In June, he was promoted to the Double-A Springfield Cardinals, skipping the High-A Palm Beach Cardinals.

Knizner finished 2017 with a combined .302 batting average with 12 home runs and 51 RBIs in 95 total games between the two clubs, including a .324 batting average in 51 games with Springfield. After the season, the Cardinals assigned Knizner to the Surprise Saguaros of the Arizona Fall League (AFL). He was named the AFL Hitter of the Week the first week of the season after tallying eight hits, two home runs, and five RBIs in 17 at-bats, and was selected to participate in the Fall Stars Game. Knizner finished the 2017 AFL batting .358 with three home runs, 12 RBIs, and a .940 OPS in 17 games. Knizner was a non-roster invitee to 2018 spring training.

Knizner began 2018 with Springfield and after batting .333/.412/.467 with two home runs and 18 RBIs in 27 games, he was promoted to the Memphis Redbirds. However, he returned to Springfield on June 9 in order to make room for Carson Kelly on the Memphis roster.

In July, he was selected to represent the Cardinals in the 2018 All-Star Futures Game. In 94 games played between Springfield and Memphis, Knizner slashed .313/.368/.430 with seven home runs and 45 RBIs.

Knizner returned to Memphis to begin 2019. On May 31, his contract was selected and he was called up to the major leagues for the first time. At the time of his call up, he was batting .286 with five home runs and 17 RBIs through 37 games with Memphis.

He made his major league debut at Busch Stadium on June 2 versus the Chicago Cubs, going 0–3 on the day as the Cardinals defeated Chicago 2–1. He was optioned back to Memphis on June 11, and recalled on July 11. He registered his first major league hit, a double, on July 17 against Chris Archer of the Pittsburgh Pirates as the Cardinals defeated Pittsburgh 6-5. On July 24, he hit his first major league home run, also against the Pittsburgh Pirates, leading St. Louis to a 14–8 win. Knizner finished his 2019 rookie regular season in St. Louis batting .226 with two home runs and seven RBIs over 53 at-bats. 

In 2020, Knizner only received 17 at-bats across eight games, recording four hits and four RBIs. For the 2021 season, Knizner returned as Yadier Molina's backup, taking 161 at-bats over 63 games, slashing .174/.281/.236 with one home run, nine RBIs, and seven doubles.

Knizner saw more playing time in 2022—260 at-bats in 96 games—as Molina dealt with injuries for much of the season, and slashed .215/.301/.300 with four home runs and 25 RBIs.

On January 13, 2023, Knizner agreed to a one-year, $1.1 million contract with the Cardinals, avoiding salary arbitration.

References

External links

NC State Wolfpack bio

1995 births
Living people
People from Henrico County, Virginia
Baseball players from Virginia
Major League Baseball catchers
St. Louis Cardinals players
NC State Wolfpack baseball players
Wareham Gatemen players
Johnson City Cardinals players
Peoria Chiefs players
Springfield Cardinals players
Memphis Redbirds players
Surprise Saguaros players